The 2019 Kangaroo Cup was a professional tennis tournament played on outdoor hard courts. It was the twenty-fourth edition of the tournament which was part of the 2019 ITF Women's World Tennis Tour. It took place in Gifu, Japan between 29 April and 5 May 2019.

Singles main-draw entrants

Seeds

 1 Rankings are as of 22 April 2019.

Other entrants
The following players received wildcards into the singles main draw:
  Mai Hontama
  Chihiro Muramatsu
  Yuki Naito
  Yuki Ukai

The following players received entry from the qualifying draw:
  Naomi Broady
  Maddison Inglis
  Haruka Kaji
  Kyōka Okamura
  Akiko Omae
  Yuan Yue

Champions

Singles

 Zarina Diyas def.  Liang En-shuo, 6–0, 6–2

Doubles

 Duan Yingying /  Han Xinyun def.  Akiko Omae /  Peangtarn Plipuech, 6–3, 4–6, [10–4]

References

External links
 2019 Kangaroo Cup at ITFtennis.com
 Official website

Kangaroo Cup
2019 ITF Women's World Tennis Tour
2019 in Japanese tennis